The 1903 Penn Quakers football team represented the University of Pennsylvania in the 1903 college football season. The Quakers finished with a 9–3 record in their second year under head coach Carl S. Williams. Significant games included victories over Penn State (39–0), Brown (30–0), and Cornell (42–0), and losses to Columbia (18–6), Harvard (17–10), and Carlisle (16–6).  The 1903 Penn team outscored its opponents by a combined total of 370 to 57. Guard Frank Piekarski was the only Penn player to receive recognition on the 1903 College Football All-America Team; Piekarski received third-team honors from Walter Camp.

Schedule

References

Penn
Penn Quakers football seasons
Penn Quakers football